1500 Broadway is a skyscraper located in Times Square, Midtown Manhattan, New York City. Replacing the Hotel Claridge, 1500 Broadway occupies an entire block front on the east side of Broadway between 43rd Street and 44th Street, and comprises 500,000 square feet of office and retail space. The property was acquired by Tamares Group in 1995.

Tenants include Times Square Studios and ABC Studios, Disney, NASDAQ, Sunrise Brokers LLC, Hewitt Associates, Fair Isaac, Starbucks, Essence Magazine, Edelman Public Relations Worldwide, and IIG Capital. In October 2022, a Gordon Ramsay Fish & Chips restaurant is planned to open at Suite 105 in 1500 Broadway. The Beijing-based, English-language newspaper China Daily publishes a U.S. edition which is also based at 1500 Broadway.

Times Square Studios

The 1500 Broadway building has been host to Times Square Studios and ABC Studios since 1985. Times Square Studios is the home of ABC's Good Morning America.

References

External links

For official 1500 Broadway in Emporis

Times Square buildings
Skyscraper office buildings in Manhattan
Office buildings completed in 1972
Broadway (Manhattan)
1972 establishments in New York City